Robert Harte is a New Zealand actor who played Ryan Birch in Shortland Street, father of Minnie Crozier but is more recently known for hosting  the New Zealand television show My House, My Castle. He currently resides in Whangarei, Northland, where he works as a lawyer in his own law firm (Rob Harte, Lawyer) and is opening a Mediation Centre.  He also referees rugby and supports a lot of community organisations.

Filmography
Hercules: The Legendary Journeys (TV series 1995)
Xena: Warrior Princess (TV series 1995–1997)
Shortland Street (TV series 1997)
City Life (TV series 1998)
My House, My Castle (TV series 1999)

See also
 List of New Zealand television personalities

References

External links
 

Living people
Year of birth missing (living people)
New Zealand male television actors
New Zealand television presenters
New Zealand male soap opera actors
20th-century New Zealand male actors